Tsentralny is a rural locality (a settlement) in Paustovskoye Rural Settlement, Vyaznikovsky District, Vladimir Oblast, Russia. The population was 1,085 as of 2010. There are 7 streets.

Geography 
Tsentralny is located 10 km south of Vyazniki (the district's administrative centre) by road. Sergeyevo is the nearest rural locality.

References 

Rural localities in Vyaznikovsky District